Stephanie Kugelman (born June 15, 1947) is a retired advertising executive, branding expert and executive mentor. She is the former Vice Chairman and Chief Strategic officer of Young & Rubicam Inc, which was a publicly traded S&P company  until its acquisition by British holding company WPP plc in 2000 for $4.7 billion. Her career at Y&R started as a junior researcher and she remains a Vice Chairman Emeritus of the company. As a brand strategist, since 2011 has most recently served on the public boards of Whole Foods Market, and Young & Rubicam Inc, and sits on the board of Home Shopping Network(HSN). She is also Vice Chairman of Solera Capital, a New York private equity firm.

Early life and education
Kugelman was born in Nyack, New York but her family moved to Weston, Connecticut, a few years later. She attended Staples High School (Connecticut).  She graduated from the Elmira College with a Bachelor of Arts degree in psychology and sociology and completed executive study business programs at Harvard School of Business and Kellogg School of Management.

Career

Kugelman was elected to the board of Y & R Inc in 1992, and several years later was named Vice Chairman and Managing Director of Y&R New York and then in 1999 became Chairman and Managing Director of Y & R New York and then Chairman and CEO of that office. Y & R was named agency of Agency-of-the-Year in 1995, 1996, and 1998. Y & R New York grew its office to over 1,200 employees and over $1 billion in media billings. In 2002 Stephanie was named Vice Chairman, Chief Strategic Officer of Y & R Worldwide and her client responsibilities includedKraft Foods, Showtime (TV network), United Airlines, Accenture, Sears across more than 100 Y & R offices. In 2007, she stepped down to start her own brand consultancy, called A Second Opinion, LLC (A.S.O.) 
  
Kugelman was named Advertising Woman of the Year in 2000  and was also inducted into the YMCA  Academy of Women Achievers. She has continued as a member of Advertising Women of New York and as a judge for the EFFIE Awards for advertising effectiveness.

Philanthropy
Kugelman served as a consultant to Women for Women International and on the boards of Gilda's Club, Safe Horizon and Scholarship Committee of Boca Grande Woman's Club.

Family
Kugelman has a daughter from her first marriage and she remarried after her husband Arthur E. Kugelman died. She currently resides with her husband Edward Vick in Old Greenwich, Connecticut.

References

External links
 

1947 births
Living people
American advertising executives
American women chief executives
Staples High School alumni
21st-century American women